Linum arboreum, called tree flax, evergreen flax and shrubby flax, is a species of Linum native to Greece, including Crete and the Aegean Islands, and Turkey. It has gained the Royal Horticultural Society's Award of Garden Merit as an ornamental.

References

arboreum
Plants described in 1753